CAREN (Computer Assisted Rehabilitation Environment) protocol—is a versatile, multi-sensory virtual reality system used for treatment and rehabilitation of human locomotion, or walking, as well as pain, posture, balance spinal stability and motor control integration.

History
MOTEK was  founded in 1993 as a privately held motion capture, animation and visualization studio.
 
The early mission of MOTEK focused on the development and implementation of innovative animation and visualization techniques focusing on real time generation of realistic animation.
 
The company managed project work to ensure growth without the need for venture capital or going public until 1998. In 1997, MOTEK had applied for a research grant to the European commission in order to develop the system now known as CAREN. This grant was received in 1998 and enabled the development of CAREN's 1st prototype.
 
The company also received external funding through TWINNING and NPM capital, both Dutch based investment companies.
 
The 1st production grade CAREN system was sold to the University of Groningen in 2000.
Within the annals of CAREN’s beginnings, the technology was being used primarily by scientific and military organizations because of the sheer complexity of its modern intricacies and somewhat complicated testing.

References

Further reading

Virtual reality
Therapy